John Bosco Jasokie also J. B. Jasokie (1927 – 19 October 2005) was an Indian politician from the state of Nagaland. He became the Chief Minister of Nagaland on two occasions as part of the Naga National Democratic Party. He was also a composer and an accomplished singer of his time and is best known for composing the Angami folk song Ara Kezivi.

Biography
John Bosco Jasokie was born in 1927 to an Angami Naga family from Khonoma.  He was the son of Dr. Khosa Zinyü (the first Naga Surgeon and member of the Naga Labour Corp). He served as a guide for Allied Forces during the World War II.

Jasokie died on 19 October 2005 at his residence in Kohima.

References

Naga people
Chief Ministers of Nagaland
People from Kohima
2005 deaths
1927 births